Barents Sea dike swarm consists of two groups of dolerite dikes across the Svalbard and Franz Josef Land regions. The emplacement of dikes was associated with the Cretaceous High Arctic Large Igneous Province (HALIP).
As revealed by aeromagnetic data, the dolerite dikes in the northern Barents Sea can be grouped in two regional dike swarms running oblique to the northern passive margin of the Barents Sea: the Franz Josef Land and Svalbard dike swarms, respectively. Multichannel seismic data indicate that the dikes fed the dolerite sills, resided in Permian to Early Cretaceous sedimentary strata in the East Barents Sea sedimentary basin. U/Pb dating of dolerites indicate an emplacement age of 121-125 Ma.

References

Geology of Svalbard
Geology of Russia
Cretaceous magmatism
Landforms of the Barents Sea
Dike swarms